Coralie Denise Simmons (born March 1, 1977) is an American water polo player, who won the silver medal at the 2000 Summer Olympics. In 2001, she won the Peter J. Cutino Award, presented annually to the top American collegiate water polo player.  Simmons is currently in her third season as the women's water polo coach at the University of California, Berkeley, after nine seasons as the head coach at Sonoma State University. She was born in Hemet, California.

Simmons joined other UCLA Bruins, Natalie Golda (2005), Kelly Rulon (2007), and Courtney Mathewson (2008), as the school's four woman Peter J. Cutino Award winners, all coached by Adam Krikorian. She was also named as an assistant coach to the USA Water Polo Women’s Senior National Team for the 2009 FINA World Championships.

National

At Hemet High School, Simmons was girls' water polo team captain and Outstanding Defensive Player for her senior year in 1994. She also lettered four years in varsity swimming, received four-time team MVP and two-time league champions. In 1995, Simmons set a California Interscholastic Federation (CIF) record in 100 breaststroke and 100 freestyle, and was recognized as CIF Outstanding Female Swimmer. Coralie Simmons played three years in soccer under coach and mother Debbie Simmons.

Coralie Simmons was a two-time National Player of the Year at UCLA. In her final season with the Bruins in 2001, UCLA captured its fourth national title in the inaugural NCAA Women's Water Polo Championship. Simmons scored with just 1:28 remaining in the final period to give the Bruins a 5-4 win, and was named the tournament MVP. She owns three of UCLA’s four offensive records in women's water polo, including career and season goals.

In June 2001, Simmons graduated from UCLA with a degree in geography and environmental studies. She was voted into the UCLA Athletics Hall of Fame in 2012.

UCLA Career Scoring
 (*school record)

Olympics and international
While still in high school, Simmons was chosen to join the U.S. Senior National team. She redshirted the 1999 and 2000 seasons at UCLA to play on the U.S. Women's National Team, helping the team qualify for the Olympic Games in the qualification tournament in Sicily by scoring a team-leading eight goals.  The US women won silver medals at both the Pan-American Games in 1999 and then the Olympics in Sydney in 2000, where Simmons tied for the team lead in scoring with nine goals. In 2001, she took home silver at the 2001 FINA World Water Polo Cup and led the team in scoring.

From 2001–2005, Simmons played for two different professional water polo teams in Athens, Greece. Her squads won three Greek Championships and one European Cup. In 2005, Coralie Simmons began her first year as an assistant coach on the University of Hawaii water polo staff.

See also
 List of Olympic medalists in water polo (women)

References

External links
 
 UCLA Team bio
 Hawaii coach bio

Water polo players at the 2000 Summer Olympics
Olympic silver medalists for the United States in water polo
American water polo coaches
UCLA Bruins women's water polo players
People from Hemet, California
Sportspeople from Riverside County, California
1977 births
Living people
American female water polo players
Medalists at the 2000 Summer Olympics